Chamaesiphon is a genus of cyanobacteria belonging to the family Chamaesiphonaceae.

The genus has cosmopolitan distribution.

Species:

Chamaesiphon amethystinus 
Chamaesiphon britannicus 
Chamaesiphon confervicola

References

Synechococcales
Cyanobacteria genera